The Women's 1500 metres competition at the 2019 World Single Distances Speed Skating Championships was held on 10 February 2019.

Results
The race was started at 14:30.

References

Women's 1500 metres